Marooned is a 1994 short film starring Robert Carlyle, Stevan Rimkus and Liza Walker. The film centres around Peter Camaron (Carlyle) who works at Left Luggage at a train station.

Cast
Robert Carlyle as Peter Camaron

Stevan Rimkus as Craig

Liza Walker as Claire

Filming
The train station scenes were filmed at Glasgow Central station.

External links

1994 films
British short films
1994 short films
Films shot in Glasgow
1990s English-language films